Nuclear protein 1 is a protein that in humans is encoded by the NUPR1 gene.

References

Further reading